The France national men's volleyball team represents the country in international competitions and friendly matches. It was the reigning European Champion in 2015 and is ranked 2nd (as of 25th July 2022) in the FIVB world ranking. 
France have been competing in the World League ever since the inaugural edition in 1990 and continuously since 1999. In 2006 they finished second to Brazil but had their share of disappointment in subsequent seasons. In 2009 they narrowly missed making the Final Six, falling at the last hurdle to Slovenia. They suffered another setback in 2010 when they again missed the finals and finished 12th.

France competed at the Olympic Games for the fourth time in Rio 2016, finishing ninth. Five years later, they unexpectedly won gold after defeating Russia in Tokyo 2020. In 2015, France won the European Championship and World League (also in 2017).

Results

Olympic Games

 Champions   Runners up   Third place   Fourth place

World Championship
 Champions   Runners up   Third place   Fourth place

World Cup
 Champions   Runners up   Third place   Fourth place

World Grand Champions Cup
 Champions   Runners up   Third place   Fourth place

World League
 Champions   Runners up   Third place   Fourth place

Nations League
 Champions   Runners up   Third place   Fourth place

European Championship
 Champions   Runners up   Third place   Fourth place

Team

Current squad
The following is the French roster in the 2022 FIVB Volleyball Men's World Championship.

Head coach:  Andrea Giani

Coach history
 1938–1946 :  Plaswick
 1946–1947 :  René Verdier
 1947–1965 :  Marcel Mathor
 1965-1965 :  Shigeyoshi Nagasaki
 1965–1968 :  Nicolae Sotir
 1968–1970 :  Georges Derose
 1970–1979 :  Roger Schmitt
 1979–1983 :  Jean-Marc Buchel
 1983-1983 :  Georges Komatov
 1983–1984 :  Éric Daniel
 1984–1985 :  Jean-Marc Buchel
 1985–1988 :  Éric Daniel
 1988–1992 :  Gérard Castan 
 1993–1994 :  Jean-Marie Fabiani
 1994–1995 :  Jean-Michel Roche
 1995-1995 :  Gérard Castan
 1995–1999 :  Vladimir Kondra
 1999–2000 :  Pierre Laborie
 2001–2012 :  Philippe Blain
 2012–2021 :  Laurent Tillie
 2021–2021 :  Bernardo Rezende
 2022–present :  Andrea Giani

Record attendance

Last updated table : December 2021.

Kit providers
The table below shows the history of kit providers for the France national volleyball team.

Sponsorship
Primary sponsors include: main sponsors like Herbalife Nutrition, Generali other sponsors: Gerflor, L'Équipe, Française des Jeux lottery, Molten, Zamst, Moneaucristaline, Veinoplus, Appartcity, Herbalife International France and Pointp-tp.

References

External links
Official website
FIVB profile

National men's volleyball teams
V
Volleyball in France
Men's sport in France